Ron Franscell (born January 29, 1957) is an American journalist, novelist and true crime writer best known for the true account The Darkest Night about the 1973 crimes against two childhood friends in the small community where Franscell grew up.

Personal life

Franscell was raised in Casper, Wyoming, where he attended Kelly Walsh High School. He attended the US Naval Academy in Annapolis and later Casper College, where he was editor of the school newspaper (The Chinook). He graduated with a bachelor's degree in journalism from the University of Wyoming in 1979.

Franscell and his wife live in Placitas, Sandoval County, New Mexico. His wife, Mary Franscell, is a high school English teacher. He has two children.

Career
He worked as a journalist in Wyoming, New Mexico and California for Gannett newspapers from 1983–1989 and is a past president of the Wyoming Press Association.

When Hurricane Rita made landfall in Texas, Franscell, managing editor at the time for the Beaumont Enterprise, rode out the storm with staff members in the newspaper's building.

In 2001, he was hired as a senior writer and columnist to write about the American West by the Denver Post, where he stayed two years. Following 9/11, he went on assignment for the Post to the Middle East. He worked for the Hearst Corporation from 2004–2008.

He was a judge for Knight Ridder newspaper's Top Books of 2003 and the International Association of Crime Writers Hammett Prize in 2017.

In 2008, the book Fall: The Rape and Murder of Innocence in a Small Town, Franscell's book about a crime against two young girls who were his next-door neighbors in Wyoming, was republished by St. Martin's Press with the new title The Darkest Night.

His book Delivered From Evil, for which he interviewed survivors of notorious mass killings in America, was released in January 2011. After the assassination attempt near Tucson, Arizona the same month of U.S. Representative Gabrielle Giffords', when 18 other people were shot, six of whom died, Franscell was asked to comment for media outlets about mass murders.

True Crime Zine gave Franscell's ninth book, The Crime Buff's Guide to Outlaw Washington, DC released by Globe Pequot Press in September 2012, a five-star review. The Huffington Post reviewed The Sourtoe Cocktail Club, about a father-and-son road trip before Franscell's son Matt left for college.

Franscell's The Crime Buff's Guide to Outlaw Pennsylvania was released by Globe Pequot in October 2013.

Awards

In 2017, the true-crime book, Morgue: A Life in Death, was nominated for an Edgar award by the Mystery Writers of America. In 1995, Franscell was awarded the national Freedom of Information Award from the Associated Press Managing Editors Association.

He was awarded the 1996 Wyoming Literary Fellowship for his first novel Angel Fire. In 1999, Angel Fire was named in the San Francisco Chronicle'''s 100 Best Novels of the 20th Century West.

In 2003, he was given the Distinguished Alumni Award by Casper College.

"The Darkest Night," a New York Times bestseller, won ForeWord Reviews magazine's gold medal for 2007 Book of the Year in true crime.

Books
FictionDeaf Row (2023)The Obituary: A Winchester Bullet Mystery (2003) WildBlue PressThe Deadline: A Winchester Bullet Mystery (1999) Write Way Publishing.Angel Fire: A novel'' (1998), Laughing Owl Publishing (Reissue: Berkley/Penguin Putnam 2000).

Non-fiction
 ShadowMan: An Elusive Psycho Killer and the Birth of FBI Profiling (2022) Berkley/Penguin-Random House
 Alice & Gerald: A Homicidal Love Story (2019) Prometheus Books
 Morgue:  A Life in Death (2016) St. Martin's Press
 Southern Fried Crime (2015), Notorious USA
 Evil at the Front Door (Notorious Louisiana) (2014), Notorious USA
 Nightmare at Noon (Notorious Texas) (2015), Notorious USA
 Delivered From Evil: True Stories of People Who Faced Monsters and Survived (2011), Fair Winds Press
 The Sourtoe Cocktail Club: The Yukon Odyssey of a Father and a Son in Search of a Mummified Human Toe ... and Everything Else (2011), Globe Pequot Press
 The Darkest Night: Two Sisters, a Brutal Murder, and the Loss of Innocence in a Small Town (2008), St. Martin's Press.. Originally titled in hardback, "Fall: The Rape and Murder of Innocence in a Small Town" (2007), New Horizon Press
 The Crime Buff's Guide to Outlaw Texas (2010), Globe Pequot Press
 The Crime Buff's Guide to the Outlaw Rockies (2011), Globe Pequot Press
 The Crime Buff's Guide to Outlaw Washington, DC (2012), Globe Pequot Press
 The Crime Buff's Guide to Outlaw Pennsylvania (2013), Globe Pequot Press
 The Crime Buff's Guide to Outlaw Arizona (2014), Angel Fire Press
 The Crime Buff's Guide to Outlaw New Mexico (2014), Angel Fire Press
 The Crime Buff's Guide to Outlaw Southwest (2014), Angel Fire Press
 The Crime Buff's Guide to Outlaw Los Angeles (2017), WildBlue Press

References

External links
Official webpage 
Publisher

20th-century American novelists
21st-century American novelists
American male novelists
American non-fiction crime writers
American male journalists
Journalists from Wyoming
Writers from San Antonio
The Denver Post people
1957 births
Living people
University of Wyoming alumni
People from Casper, Wyoming
Casper College alumni
20th-century American journalists
21st-century American journalists
20th-century American male writers
21st-century American male writers
Novelists from Texas